The following is a list of 1998 Seattle Mariners draft picks. The Mariners took part in the June regular draft, also known as the Rule 4 draft. The Mariners made 50 selections in the 1998 draft, the first being pitcher Matt Thornton in the first round. In all, the Mariners selected 23 pitchers, 9 outfielders, 7 catchers, 5 shortstops, 3 first basemen, 2 third basemen, and 1 second baseman.

Draft

Key

Table

References
General references

Inline citations

External links
Seattle Mariners official website